In mathematics, the Kervaire invariant is an invariant of a framed -dimensional manifold that measures whether the manifold could be surgically converted into a sphere. This invariant evaluates to 0 if the manifold can be converted to a sphere, and 1 otherwise. This invariant was named after Michel Kervaire who built on work of Cahit Arf.

The Kervaire invariant is defined as the Arf invariant of the skew-quadratic form on the middle dimensional homology group. It can be thought of as the simply-connected quadratic L-group , and thus analogous to the other invariants from L-theory: the signature, a -dimensional invariant (either symmetric or quadratic), and the De Rham invariant, a -dimensional symmetric invariant .

In any given dimension, there are only two possibilities: either all manifolds have Arf–Kervaire invariant equal to 0, or half have Arf–Kervaire invariant 0 and the other half have Arf–Kervaire invariant 1.

The Kervaire invariant problem is the problem of determining in which dimensions the Kervaire invariant can be nonzero. For differentiable manifolds, this can happen in dimensions 2, 6, 14, 30, 62, and possibly 126, and in no other dimensions. The final case of dimension 126 remains open.

Definition 
The Kervaire invariant is the Arf invariant of the quadratic form determined by the framing on the middle-dimensional -coefficient homology group

and is thus sometimes called the Arf–Kervaire invariant. The quadratic form (properly, skew-quadratic form) is a quadratic refinement of the usual ε-symmetric form on the middle dimensional homology of an (unframed) even-dimensional manifold; the framing yields the quadratic refinement.

The quadratic form q can be defined by algebraic topology using functional Steenrod squares, and geometrically via the self-intersections 
of immersions   determined by the framing, or by the triviality/non-triviality of the normal bundles of embeddings   (for ) and the mod 2 Hopf invariant of maps 
(for ).

History 

 used his invariant for n = 10 to construct the Kervaire manifold, a 10-dimensional PL manifold with no differentiable structure, the first example of such a manifold, by showing that his invariant does not vanish on this PL manifold, but vanishes on all smooth manifolds of dimension 10.

 computes the group of exotic spheres (in dimension greater than 4), with one step in the computation depending on the Kervaire invariant problem. Specifically, they show that the set of exotic spheres of dimension n – specifically the monoid of smooth structures on the standard n-sphere – is isomorphic to the group  of h-cobordism classes of oriented homotopy n-spheres. They compute this latter in terms of a map

where  is the cyclic subgroup of n-spheres that bound a parallelizable manifold of dimension ,  is the nth stable homotopy group of spheres, and J is the image of the J-homomorphism, which is also a cyclic group. The groups  and  have easily understood cyclic factors, which are trivial or order two except in dimension , in which case they are large, with order related to the Bernoulli numbers. The quotients are the difficult parts of the groups. The map between these quotient groups is either an isomorphism or is injective and has an image of index 2. It is the latter if and only if there is an n-dimensional framed manifold of nonzero Kervaire invariant, and thus the classification of exotic spheres depends up to a factor of 2 on the Kervaire invariant problem.

Examples 
This form thus has Arf invariant 0 (most of its elements have norm 0; it has isotropy index 1), and thus the standard embedded torus has Kervaire invariant 0.

Kervaire invariant problem 
The question of in which dimensions n there are n-dimensional framed manifolds of nonzero Kervaire invariant is called the Kervaire invariant problem. This is only possible if n is 2 mod 4, and indeed one must have n is of the form  (two less than a power of two). The question is almost completely resolved;  only the case of dimension 126 is open: there are manifolds with nonzero Kervaire invariant in dimension 2, 6, 14, 30, 62, and none in all other dimensions other than possibly 126.

Together with explicit constructions for lower dimensions (through 62), this leaves open only dimension 126.

It was conjectured by Michael Atiyah that there is such a manifold in dimension 126, and that the higher-dimensional manifolds with nonzero Kervaire invariant are related to well-known exotic manifolds two dimension higher, in dimensions 16, 32, 64, and 128, namely the Cayley projective plane  (dimension 16, octonionic projective plane) and the analogous Rosenfeld projective planes (the bi-octonionic projective plane in dimension 32, the quateroctonionic projective plane in dimension 64, and the octo-octonionic projective plane in dimension 128), specifically that there is a construction that takes these projective planes and produces a manifold with nonzero Kervaire invariant in two dimensions lower.

History 
 proved that the Kervaire invariant is zero for manifolds of dimension 10, 18
 proved that the Kervaire invariant can be nonzero for manifolds of dimension 6, 14
 proved that the Kervaire invariant is zero for manifolds of dimension 8n+2 for n>1
 proved that the Kervaire invariant can be nonzero for manifolds of dimension 30
 proved that the Kervaire invariant is zero for manifolds of dimension n not of the form 2k − 2.
 showed that the Kervaire invariant is nonzero for some manifold of dimension 62.
 showed that the Kervaire invariant is zero for  n-dimensional framed manifolds for n = 2k− 2 with k ≥ 8. They constructed a cohomology theory Ω with the following properties from which their result follows immediately:
The coefficient groups Ωn(point) have period 28 = 256 in n
The coefficient groups Ωn(point) have a "gap": they vanish for n = -1, -2, and -3
The coefficient groups Ωn(point) can detect non-vanishing Kervaire invariants: more precisely if the Kervaire invariant for manifolds of dimension n is nonzero then it has a nonzero image in Ω−n(point)

Kervaire–Milnor invariant 
and a homomorphism from the 14th stable homotopy group of spheres onto . For n = 2, 6, 14 there is an

See also
 Signature, a 4k-dimensional invariant
 De Rham invariant, a (4k + 1)-dimensional invariant

References

External links
Slides and video of lecture by Hopkins at Edinburgh, 21 April, 2009
Arf-Kervaire home page of Doug Ravenel
Harvard-MIT Summer Seminar on the Kervaire Invariant
'Kervaire Invariant One Problem' Solved, April 23, 2009, blog post by John Baez and discussion, The n-Category Café
Exotic spheres at the manifold atlas

Popular news stories
 Hypersphere Exotica: Kervaire Invariant Problem Has a Solution! A 45-year-old problem on higher-dimensional spheres is solved–probably, by Davide Castelvecchi, August 2009 Scientific American
 
 Mathematicians solve 45-year-old Kervaire invariant puzzle, Erica Klarreich, 20 Jul 2009

Differential topology
Surgery theory